The 2006 French Road Cycling Cup was the 15th edition of the French Road Cycling Cup. It started on February 18 with the Tour du Haut Var and finished on October 5 with Paris–Bourges. Lloyd Mondory of  won the overall competition.

Events

External links
  Coupe de France Standings

French Road Cycling Cup
French Road Cycling Cup
Road cycling